SMK Muhammadiyah 7 Gondanglegi (SMK MUTU) is one of the vocational schools engaged in the field of technology and engineering, business and management, and health with 10 majors or competency skills which stood on the initiative Gondanglegi District Branch Chairman of Muhammadiyah Malang with Pendiirian decree by the Minister of National Education, No. 23428 / MPK, dated 24-07-1994. SMK Muhammadiyah 7 Gondanglegi has embarked on implementing management standards ISO 9001 since 2009, and today has been certified ISO 9001: 2008. In the years 2014 - 2015 was nominated as Referral Vocational School.

Schools in Indonesia